is a music producer, singer, keyboardist, saxophone player and composer.

His mother is a Han Chinese in Japan while his father is Japanese, thus he is mixed half Chinese, half Japanese. He is a former member of Romantic Mode. After spending many years as a studio musician, he became a producer under the MUV Rinoie Ltd. label.  

His song "Synchronized Love" appears in several installments of the Dance Dance Revolution game series and in Commercials promoting Takefuji Corp with dancers.

He was most recently in the J-pop group, II Mix⊿Delta, a new formation of Two-Mix, singing alongside Minami Takayama.

References

External links

1960 births
Japanese composers
Japanese lyricists
Japanese male composers
Japanese people of Chinese descent
Japanese songwriters
Living people
Musicians from Yokohama
Video game musicians